Ursula (minor planet designation: 375 Ursula), provisional designation , is a dark asteroid and parent body of the Ursula family from the outer regions of the asteroid belt. It is one of the largest asteroids with a diameter of approximately 200 kilometers. It was discovered on 18 September 1893, by French astronomer Auguste Charlois at Nice Observatory in France. The referent of the asteroids's name is unknown.

Orbit and classification 

Ursula is the parent body of the Ursula family, a large family of C- and X-type asteroids. It orbits the Sun in the outer asteroid belt at a distance of 2.8–3.5 AU once every 5 years and 6 months (2,016 days; semi-major axis of 3.12 AU). Its orbit has an eccentricity of 0.11 and an inclination of 16° with respect to the ecliptic. The body's observation arc begins at Vienna Observatory in October 1893, three weeks after its official discovery observation at Nice.

Physical characteristics 

In the Tholen classification, Ursula is a carbonaceous C-type asteroid, while in the SMASS taxonomy, it is a Xc-subtype that transitions to the X-type asteroids.

Rotation period 

In January 2017, the so-far best-rated rotational lightcurve of Ursula was obtained from photometric observations by American astronomer Frederick Pilcher at the Organ Mesa Observatory, New Mexico. Lightcurve analysis gave a rotation period of 16.899 hours with a brightness amplitude of 0.11 magnitude.

Diameter and albedo 

According to the surveys carried out by the Japanese Akari satellite and the NEOWISE mission of NASA's Wide-field Infrared Survey Explorer, Ursula measures between 189.45 and 215.67 kilometers in diameter and its surface has an albedo between 0.04 and 0.049.

Observations of an occultation on 15 November 1984, produced six chords indicating an estimated diameter of 216±10 km. The Collaborative Asteroid Lightcurve Link derives an albedo of 0.0494 and adopts a diameter of 216.1 kilometers based on an absolute magnitude of 7.21.

Naming 

Any reference of this minor planet's name to a person or occurrence is unknown.

Unknown referent 

Among the many thousands of named minor planets, Ursula is one of only 120 for which no official naming citation has been published.

References

External links 
 Occultation of UCAC2 12060928 by 375 Ursula, Royal Astronomical Society of New Zealand, 27 May 2008
 (375) Ursula, Asteroids and comets rotation curves, Raymond Poncy and Pierre Antonini (2006), Geneva Observatory
 Asteroid Lightcurve Database (LCDB), query form (info )
 Dictionary of Minor Planet Names, Google books
 Discovery Circumstances: Numbered Minor Planets (1)-(5000) – Minor Planet Center
 
 

000375
Discoveries by Auguste Charlois
Named minor planets
000375
000375
000375
18930918